Graziella is a feminine given name. Notable people with the name include:

Graziella Concas (born 1970), Italian pianist and composer
Graziella Curreli (born 1960), French sculptor working in the Netherlands
Graziella de Michele (born 1956), French singer-songwriter of Italian descent
Graziella Fontana ( 1965–1972), Italian fashion designer
Graziella Galvani (born 1931), Italian stage, television and film actress
Graziella Granata (born 1941), Italian film and stage actress
Graziella Magherini ( 1989), Italian psychiatrist
Graziella Marok-Wachter (born 1965), Liechtenstein politician
Graziella Moretto (born 1972), Brazilian actress
Graziella Pareto (1889–1973), Catalan soprano leggiero
Graziella Pellegrini (born 1961), Italian stem cell biologist
Graziella Schmitt (born 1981), Brazilian actress
Graziella Sciutti (1927–2001), Italian soprano opera singer and producer

See also
Grace (given name)

Italian feminine given names